The Thanksgiving Candle is a monument and chapel in Soroca, Moldova.

Overview 
The monument was initiated by Ion Druţă. It represents a tribute to the anonymous heroes who have preserved the culture, language and history of Moldova. The light of the candle can be seen at night from Otaci in North and Camenca in South. 

The monument was opened on March 27, 2004, 86 years after the 1918 union of Bessarabia with Romania.

External links 

 Lumânarea Recunoştinţei 
 Soroca. Luminarea recunostintei
 Monumentul "Luminarea Recunostintei" reprezinta un omagiu eroilor anonimi care au pastrat cultura, limba si istoria Moldovei 

Soroca 
2004 sculptures
Religious buildings and structures in Moldova 
Churches in Moldova
2004 in Moldova
Religious buildings and structures completed in 2004
Tourist attractions in Moldova
Chapels in Moldova 
Monumental columns in Moldova
History of Soroca